Brendon John Cook (born 27 December 1970) is a former race driver who raced mainly in Australia, but also in Europe.

Career

Open wheelers 
Cook began racing at the age of 16 in Karts, where he won club titles, and then moved into Formula Ford in Britain. He raced four times in the British Junior series, which ran the same races as the outright series, but for different points. The highlight for him would have been out qualifying eventual Formula One driver David Coulthard. After an unsuccessful season of Formula 3 in Switzerland in 1990, he returned to Australia and competed in various club racing including Formula Ford, AUSCAR, HQ Holdens and Karts. He made a brief return to Europe in 1996 for British Formula Ford and 1998 to compete in one round of the Benelux Formula Opel series and the EFDA Nations Cup in the Netherlands. In 2002 he ran in the Australian Formula Two Championship where he finished eighth and took out the Rookie of the Year award. He returned for one race in 2011 in the Formula R class at Eastern Creek in a Reynard 913 and the 2011 Asian Formula Renault Challenge but didn't start after an accident in qualifying. In October 2011 he raced in the final two rounds of the Thoroughbred Grand Prix series driving a Tyrrell 012.

Sedan racing 
Season 1995 saw an introduction to production cars in the Eastern Creek 12 Hour, but a blown head gasket saw them not start.  He ventured to the Nurburgring 24 Hour in a Peugeot in 1996, but did not finish. From there he moved to the Australian Mitsubishi Mirage series and competed in the Bathurst 2-hour race finishing 3rd in Class B. 2004–05 he raced a Citroën Xsara in the NSW Combined Touring Car Championship, winning the state championship in his class. He raced a BMW in the 2006, and a Holden Vectra in the 2007 Australian Production Car Championship.  
2009 saw him join the Bargwanna Motorsport team in the Australian Mini Challenge.

2011 he raced in the final round of the Australian Suzuki Swift Series after practicing at the Eastern Creek and Sandown rounds without racing. He also participated in the Eastern Creek 6-hour, crashing out with two hours to go whilst leading Class E with co-driver Brooke Leech. He rejoined the series in 2012 for the fourth round at Sydney Motorsport Park finishing sixth for the weekend.  In 2013 he raced in the GT Challenge class of the Australian GT Championship driving a Porsche 997 GT3 Cup. He finished 2nd in the championship.

Stock car racing 
He joined the AUSCAR ranks in season 1991/92 after being a finalist in the Fastrack Driver Program. In the summer of 2006, he returned the ranks of Street Stockers, running at Parramatta City Speedway over the 2006–2007 season. The summer of 2010 he ventured in a part season in Wingless Sprints mainly in New South Wales. In 2011-2013 he tried to break into American speedway by running in selected factory stock events with limited success.

Career results

Karting career summary

Circuit results

† Team Result

Speedway results

Australian GT results

Rugby
Cook played both rugby league and rugby union in his early years as a utility back. Starting in league he represented Group 3 and Central Coast Juniors before going to Barker College and playing seven years of union there where he also became a certified referee. After leaving Barker, he played for Singleton Pirates, representing NSW Country Under 21s in 2 games off the bench in 1989 thanks to his family ties with Phil Hawthorne, before leaving for Europe. In 1990 after returning from Europe, he played for Sydney University Colts and at the end of 1990 Oak Bay Castaways-Wanderers in Canada. At the end of the 1992 season he switched to rugby league playing in the 1992 Pacific Cup for Norfolk Island. In 2005 he played a season in Manawatu, New Zealand. He retired from rugby after a knee injury.

Personal life
Cook's parents were hotel owners, and he and his four sisters had a nomadic lifestyle. Thus he went to boarding school at Barker College and then Sydney University. He is married (2001), has one son (2004) and a daughter (2007) and now lives in the Brisbane suburb of The Gap. His father is John Cook. He is also a member of the Wiradjuri people.

References

External links
 Driver Data Base profile
 YouTube interview
 2009 Mini Challenge Driver Profile
 Its Rugby player profile
 Cricket Archive stats

1970 births
Living people
Racing drivers from New South Wales
Sportspeople from Newcastle, New South Wales
People from the Hunter Region
Australian people of Scottish descent
Australian people of German descent
University of Sydney alumni
People educated at Barker College
Formula Ford drivers
Swiss Formula Three Championship drivers
EFDA Nations Cup drivers
Australian Formula 2 drivers
Asian Formula Renault Challenge drivers
Indigenous Australian sportspeople
Australian expatriate rugby union players
Australian rugby league players